Rushell Clayton (born 18 October 1992) is a Jamaican athlete specialising in the 400 metres hurdles. She won the bronze medal at the 2019 World Championships, setting her personal best of 53.63 seconds and at the 2019 Pan American Games. Rushell is coached by Reynaldo Walcott and is a part of Andi Sports Management.

International competitions

References

External links

1992 births
Living people
Jamaican female hurdlers
Athletes (track and field) at the 2011 Pan American Games
Athletes (track and field) at the 2019 Pan American Games
World Athletics Championships athletes for Jamaica
World Athletics Championships medalists
Pan American Games medalists in athletics (track and field)
Pan American Games bronze medalists for Jamaica
Medalists at the 2019 Pan American Games
Competitors at the 2018 Central American and Caribbean Games
20th-century Jamaican women
21st-century Jamaican women